A Hollenhorst plaque is a cholesterol embolus that is seen in a blood vessel of the retina.

Cause
It is usually seen when a physician performs ophthalmoscopy, during which a plaque will appear bright, refractile, and yellow. It is caused by an embolus lodged within the retinal vessel that originated from an atheromatous plaque in a more proximal (upstream) vessel, usually the internal carotid artery.  It is often an indication of a previous ischemic episode in the eye and is a sign of severe atherosclerosis.

Management
The most important step in management is to identify and treat the originating plaque to prevent further embolization.

Eponym
The phenomenon is named after the American ophthalmologist Robert Hollenhorst who first described their significance in 1961.

References

External links 

Vascular diseases